The National Cleveland-Style Polka Hall of Fame and Museum is a museum in Euclid, Ohio, United States. It traces the history of the Cleveland-style polka, from its Slovenian roots from the 19th century, through American factory and mining towns where it absorbed jazz and country expressions, to the post-war years when top ten polka hits got the nation on the dance floor.

Awards show
The Polka Hall of Fame holds an annual awards show on the Saturday after Thanksgiving, during the three-day Thanksgiving Polka Weekend at the Holiday Inn Cleveland South in Independence, Ohio. The show awards local and national polka groups and talents.

Hall of Fame Members

Location
The museum is located in the historic old city hall of Euclid, Ohio. The building was renovated in 2000.

See also
 List of music museums
International Polka Association
Frankie Yankovic
Verne Meisner
Joey Miskulin
Walter Ostanek

References

External links
National Cleveland-Style Polka Hall of Fame

Music halls of fame
Halls of fame in Ohio
Ethnic museums in Ohio
Music museums in Ohio
Music of Cleveland
Museums in Cuyahoga County, Ohio
Euclid, Ohio
Polka
Slovene-American culture in Ohio
Slovene-American history
European-American museums